Palinurus is a mythological figure, often portrayed as a helmsman, navigator or guide.

Palinurus may also refer to:

Ships and boats
 , a sloop or brig built for Bombay Marine, the naval arm of the British East India Company
 Palinurus, a ship wrecked off the Isles of Scilly in 1848
 Palinurus, formerly Luciole (barge), a hotel barge on the French canal system
 USC&GS Palinurus, commanded by Richardson Clover (1846–1919)

Other uses
 4832 Palinurus, a Jupiter trojan asteroid
 Palinurus (crustacean), a genus of spiny lobsters in the family Palinuridae
 Palinurus, the pseudonym of Cyril Connolly as author of The Unquiet Grave (1944)
 Palinurus of Mexico, the translation of a 1976 novel by Fernando del Paso
 Strait of Palinurus and Bay of Palinurus, classical albedo features on Mars

See also
 Conus ammiralis var. palinurus, a sea snail
 
 Palinure (disambiguation)
 Palinuro (disambiguation)